L'Isle-aux-Allumettes is a municipality in the Outaouais region, part of the Pontiac Regional County Municipality, Quebec, Canada. The municipality consists primarily of Allumette Island (in French Île aux Allumettes), and also includes Morrison Island, Marcotte Island, and some minor islets, all in the Ottawa River north of Pembroke.

In the past, the island and municipalities have been spelled in French in various ways:
 Isle-des-Allumettes
 L'Île-Allumettes
 Île-aux-Allumettes

Etymology
The name Isle-aux-Allumettes literally means "Island of Matches", and may refer to a box of matches that was left behind. In 1686, Chevalier de Troyes wrote about the island: “A Jesuit passing here another time forgot a box of matches which he carried to make a fire. This is why the Voyageurs gave the name “L’Isle-aux-Allumettes”.

Another theory claims that the place was named for the reeds that grew on the island which were used as matches.

Geography

The municipality consists mostly of agricultural land. Its population centres are Chapeau, Desjardinsville, Demers Centre, and Saint-Joseph.

History
The Kichesipirini Algonquins first occupied the site in order to maintain control of trade on the Ottawa River. For this reason, Samuel de Champlain named it Isle des Algoumequins during his trip of 1613. In 1650, this native population was almost entirely exterminated by the Iroquois.

In his memoirs written during the second half of the 17th century, Nicolas Perrot made mention of the "One-Eyed Man's Island otherwise called Matches Island" ("Isle du Borgne autrement ditte l'Isle des Allumettes"). "One-Eyed" was a reference to the disability of Tessouat, an Algonquin chief in the region. The name "Allumettes" was first given to the rapids south-east of the island; a map from 1680 refers to these as Sault des Allumettes (Matches Falls).

It was not until 1818 that Europeans began to settle on the island. They worked mostly as loggers or for the Hudson's Bay Company which had a fur trading post just upstream at Fort William. The preferred transport route was still the river, so most families build their homes on the southside of the island where the church of Saint-Alphonse-de-l'Île-aux-Allumettes Parish was built in 1840. The Île-aux-Allumettes Township was formed in 1847, and its first mayor was Andrew Whelan.

An intense fire destroyed almost all the buildings in 1853 and, thereafter, the population settled more toward the northern part, on the current site of Chapeau village. In 1874, the village of Chapeau separated from the township and became an incorporated municipality, with Patrick Cunningham as the first mayor.

In 1910, the parish of Saint-Joseph-de-l'Île-aux-Allumettes was established on the eastern part of the island, leading to the formation of the Municipality of L'Isle-aux-Allumettes-Partie-Est in 1920.

On December 30, 1998, the municipality of Chapeau Village and the township municipalities of L'Isle-aux-Allumettes and L'Isle-aux-Allumettes-Part-East were merged into the new Municipality of L'Isle-aux-Allumettes.

Demographics

Population

Language
Mother tongue (2021):
 English as first language: 75.7%
 French as first language: 18.1%
 English and French as first language: 3.6%
 Other as first language: 2.2%

Local government
List of former mayors (since formation of current municipality):
 Jérôme Sallafranque (1998–1999)
 Denzil Spence (1999–2005)
 Brian Adam (2005–2009)
 Winston Sunstrum (2009–2021)
 Corey Spence (2021–present)

See also
 List of municipalities in Quebec

References

External links

Incorporated places in Outaouais
Municipalities in Quebec